Jimmy Wayne is the debut studio album by American country music singer Jimmy Wayne. It was released in the United States on DreamWorks in mid 2003, it produced four chart singles on the Billboard Hot Country Songs charts. The album's first two singles, "Stay Gone" and "I Love You This Much", both reached Top Ten on that chart, peaking at No. 3 and No. 6, respectively. Following these two songs were "You Are" and "Paper Angels", both of which peaked at No. 18. It was also his only album for the DreamWorks label, which was closed in 2006. "Stay Gone" and "I Love You This Much" were both included on Wayne's next solo album Do You Believe Me Now.

Critical reception
Reviewing for AllMusic, critic Thom Jurek wrote of the album "He can write, sing and yeah, for a guy who spent so much of his life living outdoors and in shelters, he's a handsome devil too. But the grain of truth that's in his voice outstrips any image or sonic trappings that may be placed upon him from outside. Keep your ears open; this young man is no flash in the pan." and reviewing for Entertainment Weekly, critic Alanna Nash wrote of the album "Wayne sings with pop-star stylings, but his bruised songs throb with stone-cold truths."

Track listing

Personnel
Compiled from liner notes.

Musicians
 Tim Akers – keyboards, piano
 Tom Bukovac – electric guitar
 Eric Darken – percussion
 Chip Davis – background vocals
 Paul Franklin – steel guitar
 Kenny Greenberg – electric guitar
 Aubrey Haynie – fiddle, mandolin
 Wes Hightower – background vocals
 B. James Lowry – acoustic guitar
 Brent Mason – electric guitar
 Steve Nathan – keyboards, piano
 Jimmie Lee Sloas – bass guitar
 Biff Watson – acoustic guitar
 Jimmy Wayne – lead vocals, acoustic guitar
 Kris Wilkinson – strings
 Lonnie Wilson – drums
 Glenn Worf – bass guitar
 Jonathan Yudkin – fiddle, mandolin
Technical
 Scott Borchetta – executive production
 Ricky Cobble – recording
 Greg Droman – mixing (except "Just a Dream")
 Julian King – recording (all tracks), mixing ("Just a Dream" only)
 Chris Lindsey – production, recording
 Ken Love – mastering
 James Stroud – production
 Hank Williams – mastering

Chart performance

Weekly charts

Year-end charts

Singles

References

2003 debut albums
Jimmy Wayne albums
DreamWorks Records albums
Albums produced by James Stroud
Albums produced by Chris Lindsey